Kim Shin-young (hanja: 金信泳, born 16 June 1983), is a South Korean football striker.

He debuted at Cerezo Osaka and also played for Sagan Tosu, Ventforet Kofu and Ehime FC mostly in the J2 League. He later plays Busan IPark, Jeonbuk Hyundai Motors, Chunnam Dragons in K League Classic, the top Korean league.

Club statistics

References

External links
 
Ehime F.C.
Kim Sin-young at Yahoo! Japan 

Kim Shin-young at hyundai-motorsfc.com

1983 births
Living people
Association football forwards
South Korean footballers
South Korean expatriate footballers
South Korean expatriate sportspeople in Japan
Expatriate footballers in Japan
Cerezo Osaka players
Sagan Tosu players
Ventforet Kofu players
Ehime FC players
Jeonnam Dragons players
Jeonbuk Hyundai Motors players
Busan IPark players
AC Nagano Parceiro players
J1 League players
J2 League players
J3 League players
K League 1 players
Hanyang University alumni